Qurdlar or Kyurdlyar or Kurtlar may refer to:
Kürdlər (disambiguation), Azerbaijan
Qurdlar, Agdam, Azerbaijan
Qurdlar, Barda, Azerbaijan
Kurtlar, Acıpayam
Kurtlar, Dursunbey, Turkey
Kurtlar, Mudurnu, Turkey